The Embassy of Egypt in Moscow is the diplomatic mission of the Arab Republic of Egypt to the Russian Federation. The chancery is located at 12 Kropotkinsky Lane in the Khamovniki District of Moscow.

See also
 Egypt–Russia relations
 Diplomatic missions in Russia

References

External links
  Embassy Of Egypt in Moscow

Egypt–Russia relations
Egypt
Moscow
Khamovniki District
Egypt–Soviet Union relations
Cultural heritage monuments of federal significance in Moscow